The Beijing BJ40 is an off-road vehicle produced by BAIC Motor. Originally branded directly as a BAIC product, the vehicle series was rebadged under the Beijing brand after the brand was introduced in 2019.

Overview
The BJ40 is divided into four trim levels, the BJ40 S (Super), BJ40 P (Professional), BJ40 C (City) and BJ40 SE (Special Edition). They were designated for different target consumer groups.

BAIC BJ40 
The BAIC B40/BJ40 originally debuted as a concept during the 2010 Beijing Auto Show, and it is controversial as it resembles the iconic Jeep Wrangler styling wise.

The Production BJ40 debuted on the 2013 Guangzhou Auto Show. The BJ naming system stands for BeiJing, the capital of country and brand name of the vehicle. 

The BJ40 comes with a 2.4 liter four-cylinder petrol engine producing 143 HP and 217 Nm of torque mated to a 5-speed manual gearbox with a minimum ground clearance of 210 mm, an approach angle of 37°, departure angle of 33°, and a 24° vertical angle.

BAIC BJ40L 
The BAIC BJ40L is the 4-door long wheelbase version of the BJ40 and it debuted on the 2016 Beijing Auto Show which also previewed the facelift of the BJ40. Prices for the BJ40L ranges from 129,800 to 179,800 yuan.

2019 facelift 
A facelift was launched for the BJ40 2019 model year. The facelift cancelled the "L" nameplate with the 4-door models renamed to BJ40 Plus. The 2019 model also features a revised front fascia design and updated tail lamps and rear bumper. The update also features a revised front and rear end styling, and a 2.0 liter turbo engine producing 160 kW and 320 Nm.

A version called the Beijing BJ40 Plus City Hunter Edition was also revealed in 2019 via the 2019 Shanghai Auto Show. The BJ40 City Hunter Edition is part of the BJ40 "C" series trim level which stands for "City". In terms of technology, the infotainment system is equipped with an upgraded 2.0 intelligent voice interaction system, 12.3-inch full LCD instrument panel, 10-inch smart car display and streaming media with an automatic anti-glare rear view mirror. The version also has interior features including surround sound, voice control, power seat and three-speed heating seat to meet the needs of urban users of the "C" trim.

The Beijing BJ40 City Hunter Edition is powered by a 2.0 liter turbocharged direct-injection gasoline engine with a maximum power of 160 kW and a peak torque of 320 Nm mated to a 6-speed automatic transmission supplied by ZF. The Beijing BJ40 City Hunter Edition is also equipped with an electronically controlled time-sharing four-wheel drive system, and provides a variety of different driving modes for different terrains. On 2020, Sazgar signed an agreement with BAIC to produce the BJ40 in complete knock down in Pakistan and by 29 May 2021 production of the SUV started.

Beijing F40 
On September 16, 2019, BAIC launched the Beijing off-road F40 pickup, priced at 149,800 yuan (~US$21,200). The Beijing F40 is the pickup model of Beijing BJ40 with adjusted appearance details and adopts a single-row cabin design. The second row space was replaced by an exposed cargo bed. The Beijing F40 pickup is powered by 2.3 liter turbocharged engine shared with the BJ40.

2020 Beijing Auto BJ40 
For the 2020 model year, Beijing Off-Road launched the BJ40 Tribute 2020 version was launched with two configuration models, priced at 169,900 yuan and 200,000 yuan.

References

External links
 Official site

Sport utility vehicles
Off-road vehicles
BJ40
Cars introduced in 2013